The Royal National Institute for Deaf People (RNID), known as Action on Hearing Loss from 2011 to 2020, is a charitable organization working on behalf of the UK's 9 million people who are deaf or have hearing loss.

History
The Royal National Institute for Deaf People was founded as the National Bureau for Promoting the General Welfare of the Deaf in 1911 by Leo Bonn (Leo Bernard William Bonn) a deaf merchant banker, and philanthropist, in the ballroom of his home, at Bonn House, 22 Upper Brook Street, Mayfair, on 9 June 1911. The house is marked by a memorial plaque unveiled by Prince Philip, Duke of Edinburgh, Patron to the RNID, on 9 June 1998.

The Bureau was reorganised as the National Institute for the Deaf in 1924. Alongside its role in influencing public policy in favour of people who are hard of hearing in the UK, it also developed a role as a provider of care to deaf and hard of hearing people with additional needs during the late 1920s and early 1930s.

During the 1940s, with the introduction of the National Health Service to the UK, it successfully campaigned for the provision of free hearing aids through the new welfare state system. The 1950s and 1960s saw its increasing influence marked by Royal recognition: in 1958, Prince Philip became the Patron of the Institute; and in 1961 Elizabeth II approved the addition of the "Royal" prefix, creating the Royal National Institute for the Deaf (RNID).

The Institute expanded into medical and technological research during the 1960s and 1970s, being a key player in the development of NHS provided behind-the-ear hearing aids. During the 1980s it developed the Telephone Exchange for the Deaf, a pioneering relay service allowing telephone users and deaf "textphone" users to communicate with each other using a third-party operator to relay voice and text communication. This became the service known as Typetalk in 1991, funded by BT but operated on their behalf by RNID until 7 December 2009 when the RNID stepped down from the service.  It is now solely owned, run and managed by BT alone. In March 2009 the name of the Typetalk service was changed to Text Relay.

In 1992 the Institute changed its name to the Royal National Institute for Deaf People but kept the initials RNID.

June 2011 saw celebrations of 100 years of the RNID and a new trading name. "Action on Hearing Loss" was chosen to describe the breadth of help and support they provided for people with all types of hearing loss—from people who were profoundly deaf, to people who were losing their hearing. While trading under the new name, they kept the legal name, Royal National Institute for Deaf People.

RNID announced in 2020 that it was selling its 23 care homes and its supported living, community and domiciliary care services which it had been providing since 1929. The charity’s 560 clients were told their homes and services were to be sold and the 600 staff would be transferred to a new owner. This was despite the organisation’s chief executive saying in 2018 he had no plans to carry out the same kind of mass sale of services that he oversaw in his previous position as chief executive of the disability charity Scope.

Its 2017/2018 annual accounts showed the charity had an income of £40.1m but spent £42.7m. This was the fifth time in six years that the charity's expenditure had exceeded its income. RNID's auditor PricewaterhouseCoopers said that "material uncertainty" over fundraising income and other conditions cast doubt on the charity’s ability to "continue as a going concern".

A financial recovery plan was delivered in the 2019/20 financial year. As a result, RNID's auditors expressed no further concerns about the charity's going concern status in the accounts signed in November 2019. Like all charities, the COVID-19 pandemic has resulted in new financial pressures for RNID. However, as a result of the financial recovery plan and ongoing prudent financial management, RNID is confident in its ongoing financial sustainability.

In 2020, partly as a response to the COVID-19 pandemic, the charity rebranded and reverted to the RNID name, stating a new purpose: "Together, we will make life fully inclusive for deaf people and those with hearing loss or tinnitus."

The charity's care and support services in England and Wales were acquired by Achieve together, a provider of specialist support for people with learning disabilities, autism and associated complex needs in 2021.

Activities
RNID activities include:

 campaigning and lobbying, with the help of members, to change laws and government policies
 providing information and raising awareness of deafness, hearing loss and tinnitus
 giving training courses and consultancy on deafness and disability
 offering communication services including sign language interpreters
 making lasting change in education for deaf children and young people
 supporting deaf people into work with the organisations employment programmes
 providing care services for deaf and hard of hearing people with additional needs
 social, medical and technical research.

Present operations
RNID lobbies and works with the UK government on modernisation of the UK's audiology services. This included the switch over from analogue to digital hearing aids provided under the NHS.

RNID has also undertakes product development. The RNID Product Development team won an Innovation Award for their work on a new genre of telephone - the ScreenPhone, though this has now been discontinued.
The Screenphone is now discontinued.

Hearing check
RNID has developed an online free, confidential online hearing check, which can identify potential hearing problems. The five-minute check assesses a person's ability to hear someone speaking when there is background noise.

Celebrity Ambassadors

Ambassadors include Samantha Baines(current) and Scarlette Douglas(past).

References

External links 
 

1911 establishments in the United Kingdom
Charities for disabled people based in the United Kingdom
Disability rights organizations
Deafness organizations
Deaf culture in the United Kingdom
Deafness charities